Cornelia Frances Zulver, OAM (7 April 1941 – 28 May 2018), credited professionally as Cornelia Frances, was an English-Australian actress. After starting her career in small cameos in films in her native England, she became best known for her acting career in Australia after emigrating there in the 1960s, particularly her iconic television soap opera roles with portrayals of nasty characters. 

Frances was of the latter known for her role as Morag Bellingham on Home and Away since its inception in 1988, after leaving that series, she appeared on a semi-regular basis as the storyline permitted, rejoining briefly as a permanent cast member in 2001, before going back to an itinerant basis.

Frances was also known for playing nurse Sister/Matron Grace Scott on the Nine Network series The Young Doctors (1976–1978), and Barbara Hamilton on Sons and Daughters on Network Seven (1982–1986). She appeared in the film version of regular series TV soap The Box. She also worked on stage and in voice-over. In the early 2000s, she was the host of the Australian version of quiz show The Weakest Link.

Early life and career
Born in Liverpool, Lancashire, England, Frances was educated at the Guildhall School of Music and Drama in London. Her early work was in British-made feature films as an extra and bit-part player. This included uncredited bit parts in two films directed by her uncle Michael Powell: Peeping Tom (1960), and The Queen's Guards (1961). She also had a small speaking role in Herbert Ross' film adaptation of Goodbye, Mr. Chips and appeared in various theatre productions, like The Trials of Oscar Wilde.

Career in Australia
Frances' acting career flourished after she had emigrated to Australia in the 1960s. She worked at the Playhouse Theatre in Perth appearing in Henry IV Parts I and 2, (1967) directed by Edgar Metcalfe; and Mary Mary which toured regional Western Australia and played a season at the Playhouse. She appeared nightly on television as the host of Channel 9's Tom's TV Bingo; Tom's was a supermarket in Perth. After taking a lead role in The Box, the 1975 film adaptation of the sex-comedy soap opera of the same name, and the role of Mrs Quinn in The Lost Islands in 1976, she became known across Australia for her long-running role of the strict and acidic Sister Grace Scott in daily soap opera The Young Doctors. After leaving that series to move to Melbourne with her husband who had been transferred there, she worked as a television reporter on "light" stories for Peter Couchman's Melbourne, a current affairs program hosted by Peter Couchman.

In April 1980, Frances made a guest appearance as lawyer Carmel Saunders on Prisoner. Later she acted in guest-starring television roles, before taking another well-remembered role, that of Barbara Armstrong (later Hamilton) in Sons and Daughters, a role she played from 1982 until 1986.

On 7 June 1988, Frances made her first appearance on Home and Away as Morag Bellingham, a judge and sister of Alf Stewart (Ray Meagher), whom she always clashed with, as well as the sister of Celia Stewart (Fiona Spence) and half-sister of, (much to her dislike) of Colleen Smart (Lyn Collingwood), both of whom she always also shared comic banter with. Frances played the recurring role of Morag for twenty-nine years. She expressed a desire to play Morag full-time on the show, and admitted that she did not like the coming-and-going as it was "very unsettling."

From 1997 to 1998, Frances provided the voice of Tortoise on the Australian/Chinese children's series Magic Mountain. She also hosted the Australian version of quiz show The Weakest Link (2001–2002). In the early 2000s, Frances worked for a winery in the Hunter Valley when she could not get acting work. Her autobiography And What Have You Done Lately? was published in 2003.

Frances' later career involved voice acting in Milly, Molly and a main role in the Australian stage production of Calendar Girls. Her final television appearance was in a 2017 episode of Home and Away.

On 26 January 2019, Frances was awarded the Medal of the Order of Australia (OAM).

Charity work
In 2011, Frances joined the Australian Orangutan Project (AOP) as its first Ambassador in an effort to raise awareness about critically endangered orangutans. Frances travelled to the island of Borneo, Indonesia, on 16 October 2011 to see first-hand the effect of the widespread deforestation of orangutan habitat, and how orangutans are being rehabilitated. In June 2016, Frances made a sizable donation to the National Health Organisation in order to bring awareness to female reproductive health.

Personal life and death
Frances married Michael Eastland in 1969, the marriage later ended in divorce. They had one son together, named Lawrence.

In January 2018, she revealed that she was battling bladder cancer that had spread to her hip, but stated that she was hopeful of reprising her role of Morag in Home and Away for the show's 30th anniversary. However, she succumbed to the cancer, after it had metastasized to her spine, despite having undergone chemotherapy and radiation treatment, and died on 28 May 2018 at the age of 77 at the Royal North Shore Hospital in Sydney, coincidentally where the show The Young Doctors was filmed. Paying tribute to Frances, the Seven Network, which airs Home and Away in Australia, said: "Cornelia Frances was a unique person. Her on-screen presence inspired a generation of actors. This gift was coupled with an ability to bring a sense of dignity and presence into each room she entered. Her energy and character will be missed." She was also given tributes from her numerous co-stars including Ray Meagher and Judy Nunn. A private funeral was held later that week.

Filmography

Television

Stage

References

External links

Cornelia Frances Au soaps profile
Digital Spy interviews Cornelia Frances

1941 births
2018 deaths
Alumni of the Guildhall School of Music and Drama
Actresses from London
Actresses from Liverpool
English emigrants to Australia
English film actresses
English game show hosts
English television actresses
English television personalities
Australian film actresses
Australian game show hosts
Australian television actresses
Australian television personalities
Women television personalities
Deaths from bladder cancer
Deaths from cancer in New South Wales
Recipients of the Medal of the Order of Australia
20th-century British businesspeople